Gustavo Kuerten was the defending champion but did not compete that year.

Guillermo Coria won in the final 4–6, 6–2, 7–5 against Gastón Gaudio.

Seeds

  Franco Squillari (second round)
  Marcelo Ríos (first round)
  Gastón Gaudio (final)
  Fernando Vicente (first round)
  Francisco Clavet (quarterfinals)
  Hicham Arazi (second round)
  Álex Calatrava (second round)
  Juan Ignacio Chela (first round)

Draw

Finals

Top half

Bottom half

External links
 Singles draw

2001 Singles
2001 ATP Tour